Shuyang may refer to several places in China:
 Shuyang County (沭阳县) in Suqian City, Jiangsu Province
 Shuyang, Xianghe County (淑阳镇), a town  in Xianghe County, Hebei
 Shuyang, Nanjing County (书洋镇), a town in Nanjing County, Fujian